The Hebron River or Stream, in Hebrew Nahal Hevron, in Arabic Wadi al-Samen and Wadi al-Khalil, is a stream that flows along the border between Judea and the Negev. The source of the Hebron River is the city of Hebron, which is mostly in the Palestinian Authority. The stream is part of the basin of the Besor Stream. It passes near Dahariya, Beersheba and the northern Negev, drains to Nahal Be'er Sheva near the settlement of Omer and ends in the Mediterranean Sea on the shores of the Gaza Strip. In the territory of the State of Israel, the stream flows through the jurisdictional areas of Meitar, Abu Basma, Omer, Tel Sheva, and Galili, under the responsibility of the Ministry of the Interior.

Pollution 
Stream flowing wastewater from cities and industries, and wastewater from sawmills and quarries originating from Palestinian cities, residential, and quarries built along it. In the Beer Sheva Valley sewage is a significant environmental hazard, because thousands of people live close to the river bed.

The main source of pollution is the sewage of Hebron and Kiryat Arba, estimated at 15,000 cubic meters per day, which also pollutes the Besor Nature Reserve, which changes the nature of the stream from a failed stream that flows high-quality floodwater into a stream with a permanent flow of polluted sewage . Sewage flows throughout the year that pollute the stream and groundwater in the stream, and there are additions of urban and industrial effluents.

The Ministry of Environmental Protection, the Society for the Protection of Nature in Israel (SPNI) and the Shikma-Besor Drainage Authority operate an educational program in the Hebron Stream called "Longing for the River". The three-year plan is aimed at people living in the vicinity of the Hebron River, in order to develop awareness and responsibility for the river and its surroundings. The program relates to the way in which the knowledge base, connection and belonging between different population groups and the stream can be created with the participation of the formal and informal education system.

References

Rivers of Israel
Geography of the Gaza Strip
Landforms of Southern District (Israel)
Rivers of the Gaza Strip
Negev